Mara of the Wilderness is a 1965 adventure film directed by Frank McDonald, produced by former Disney animator Brice Mack with his studio Unicorn Films, and starring Adam West, Lori Saunders, and Theodore Marcuse.

Plot
In the contemporary areas of Alaska, Mara Wade (Lori Saunders) is a barefoot wild woman whose parents are killed in a Bear attack. Raised by wolves and wearing only a fur dress, she rescues and befriends an anthropologist named Ken Williams (Adam West) who is interested in teaching her what is in the world. But she is hunted as well by a ruthless carnival worker named Jarnagan (Theodore Marcuse) causing Ken to work to keep her safe.

Cast
 Adam West as Ken Williams
 Lori Saunders as Mara Wade (credited as Linda Saunders)
Lelia Walsh as Mara Wade - Age Seven
Denver Pyle as Kelly
 Theodore Marcuse as Jarnagan
 Roberto Contreras as Friday
 Eve Brent as Mrs. Wade
 Ed Kemmer as First Pilot
 Stuart Walsh as Second Pilot

References

External links
 

1965 films
1960s English-language films
1965 adventure films
Films directed by Frank McDonald
Jungle girls
American adventure films
1960s American films